Dr. John J. Nowak House is a historic home located at Lancaster in Erie County, New York.  It is a locally significant and distinct example of the Spanish Revival style built for Dr. John J. Nowak in 1930. Several additions were built throughout the years and it is now used as a nursing home.

It was listed on the National Register of Historic Places in 1999.  It is located in the Broadway Historic District.

References

External links
Nowak, Dr. John J., House - U.S. National Register of Historic Places on Waymarking.com

Houses on the National Register of Historic Places in New York (state)
Houses completed in 1929
Houses in Erie County, New York
National Register of Historic Places in Erie County, New York
Historic district contributing properties in Erie County, New York